The Great Britain team will compete at the 2011 World Aquatics Championships in Shanghai, China. Britain has selected a team of 40, 20 of each gender, for the FINA World Championships in Shanghai next month.

Medalists

Diving

Great Britain has qualified 11 athletes in diving.

Men

Women

Open water swimming

Men

Women

Swimming

Great Britain qualified 38 swimmers.

Men

Women

 * qualified due to the withdrawal of another swimmer
 ** raced in heats only

Synchronised swimming

Great Britain has qualified 11 athletes in synchronised swimming.

Women

References

Nations at the 2011 World Aquatics Championships
World Aquatics Championships
Great Britain at the World Aquatics Championships